The Men's 200 Freestyle at the 10th FINA World Swimming Championships (25m) was swum 15 December 2010 in Dubai, United Arab Emirates. 78 individuals swam in the Preliminary heats in the morning, with the top-8 finishers advanced to the final that evening.

At the start of the event, the existing World (WR) and Championship records (CR) were:

The following records were established during the competition:

Results

Heats

Final

References

Freestyle 0200 metre, Men's
World Short Course Swimming Championships